Out Loud may refer to:

Out Loud (Boom Boom Satellites album), 1998
Out Loud (Naio Ssaion album), 2005
"Out Loud" (song), a 2017 song by Gabbie Hanna

See also
Out Louder, a 2006 album by Medeski Scofield Martin & Wood
Outloud (disambiguation)